Acrolophus propinqua (Walsingham's grass tubeworm moth) is a moth of the family Acrolophidae. It is found in North America, including Alabama, Florida, Georgia, Illinois, Louisiana, Maryland, Mississippi, North Carolina, New York, Ohio, South Carolina, Tennessee, Virginia and West Virginia.

The wingspan is 22–26 mm.

References

propinqua
Moths described in 1887